Clastoptera achatina, the pecan spittlebug, is a species of spittlebug in the family Clastopteridae. It is found in North America.

References

Further reading

External links

 

Clastopteridae
Articles created by Qbugbot
Insects described in 1839